The 1859 Wisconsin gubernatorial election was held on November 8, 1859. Republican Party incumbent Governor Alexander Randall won re-election with 53% of the vote, defeating Democratic candidate Harrison Carroll Hobart.

Democratic Party
Harrison Carroll Hobart was a member of the Wisconsin State Assembly at the time of the election, representing Calumet County.  He had previously served as Speaker of the Assembly in the 1849 session, and was state senator for the 1st district in the 1st Wisconsin Legislature.

Republican Party
Alexander W. Randall was the incumbent Governor, having been elected in the 1857 election.  He had previously served as a Wisconsin Circuit Court Judge in Milwaukee, and served one term in the Wisconsin State Assembly in 1855.  Earlier, in 1846, Randall had been a delegate to the first Wisconsin constitutional convention and had successfully advocated for including a provision by which African American suffrage could be legalized via referendum.

Results

| colspan="6" style="text-align:center;background-color: #e9e9e9;"| General Election, November 8, 1859

References

1859
1859 Wisconsin elections
Wisconsin